Rembercourt may refer to:

 Rembercourt-Sommaisne, a commune in the Meuse department of Lorraine, France
 Rembercourt Aerodrome, a temporary World War I airfield nearby
 Rembercourt-sur-Mad, a commune in the Meurthe-et-Moselle department of Lorraine, France

See also
Raimbeaucourt, a commune in the Nord department of Nord-Pas-de-Calais, France